Óhíd is a village in Zala County, Hungary. It is located 10 km west of Sümeg and 25 north of Keszthely, the largest city at the shore of the Lake Balaton.

References

Populated places in Zala County